Maurice Jouvet (Hendaye, 3 February 1923 – Buenos Aires, 5 March 1999) was a French-born Argentine actor. He was married to actress Nelly Beltrán, with whom he had a daughter with.

Selected filmography 
 1942: Bajó un ángel del cielo.
 1955: La mujer desnuda.
 1956: Enigma de mujer.
 1962: Bajo un mismo rostro.
 1963: Rata de puerto, como el Rumano.
 1964: Así o de otra manera.
 1964: Canuto Cañete y los 40 ladrones.
 1964: Con gusto a rabia.
 1964: El octavo infierno, cárcel de mujeres, como Pardo
 1964: Máscaras en otoño.
 1965: Ahorro y préstamo para el amor.
 1965: Canuto Cañete, detective privado.
 1965: Pajarito Gómez, una vida feliz.
 1966: La buena vida.
 1966: Escala musical.
 1966: La gorda.
 1966: Vivir es formidable.
 1967: Coche cama, alojamiento.
 1967: La cigarra está que arde.
 1968: Destino para dos.
 1968: La casa de Madame Lulú.
 1968: Ufa con el sexo.
 1968: Villa Cariño está que arde.
 1969: Blum.
 1969: Deliciosamente amoral.
 1972: Autocine mon amour.
 1972: Nino.
 1974: En el gran circo.
 1974: La Patagonia rebelde.
 1974: Los Gauchos judíos.
 1975: Más allá del sol.
 1976: Don Carmelo Il Capo.
 1977: Los superagentes biónicos.
 1978: El divorcio está de moda (de común acuerdo).
 1979: Custodio de señoras.
 1980: Comandos azules, como Nicolái Pushkin.
 1981: La magia de Los Parchís, como Villegas.
 1982: Las aventuras de los Parchís.
 1984: Todo o nada.
 1987: La Clínica del Dr. Cureta.
 1987: Los taxistas del humor.
 1990: Negra medianoche.
 1991: Ya no hay hombres.
 1991: Manuela.
 1996: El mundo contra mí.

References

External links
 
 Maurice Jouvet- Cine Nacional

1923 births
1999 deaths
People from Hendaye
French emigrants to Argentina
Naturalized citizens of Argentina
Argentine people of French descent
20th-century Argentine male actors
Burials at La Chacarita Cemetery
Argentine male film actors